The 1st Islamic Solidarity Games held in the Islamic holy city of Mecca in Saudi Arabia from 8–20 April 2005 with an Olympic-style tournament aimed at showing Muslim sports prowess and featuring 6,000 athletes. Only men's events were included on the programme.

Fifty five nations participated in the said "Islamic Olympic Games", hosted by the Saudi cities of Mecca, Medina, Jeddah and Ta’if.

Prince Abdul Majeed bin Abdulaziz Al Saud, the prince of Mecca, opened the games in a ceremony in which more than 2,600 students participated at King Abdul Aziz Stadium.

Sports

 Aquatic sports 
 Swimming (19)
 Diving (2)
 Water polo (1)
 Athletics (23) 
 Basketball (1)
 Equestrian (4)
 Fencing (6)
 Football (1)
 Handball (1)
 Karate (11)
 Table tennis (3)
 Taekwondo (8)
 Tennis (3)
 Volleyball (1)
 Weightlifting (24)
 Paralympic sports
 ID Futsal (1)
 Goalball (1)

Medal table

References

1st Islamic Solidarity Games 
Medal table

 
Islamic Games
Islamic Solidarity Games
Islamic Solidarity Games, 2005
Solidarity Games
International sports competitions hosted by Saudi Arabia
Multi-sport events in Saudi Arabia
Sport in Mecca
21st century in Mecca